Eddie Alexander (born 10 August 1964) is a Scottish former cyclist and a multiple national champion on the track in the tandem sprint.

Cycling career
He won a bronze medal in the sprint at the 1986 Commonwealth Games in Edinburgh. He was fourth in the sprint at the 1988 Olympic Games in Seoul.

Alexander is a six times British track champion, winning the British National Individual Sprint Championships in 1987 and 1988, the British National Individual Time Trial Championships in 1985 and 1987 and the British National Tandem Sprint Championships in 1987 and 1988.

Palmarès

1985
1st Kilo, British National Individual Time Trial Championships

1986
3rd  Sprint, Commonwealth Games

1987
1st British National Tandem Sprint Championships
1st British National Individual Sprint Championships
1st Kilo, British National Individual Time Trial Championships

1988
1st British National Tandem Sprint Championships
1st British National Individual Sprint Championships
4th Sprint, Olympic Games

See also
City of Edinburgh Racing Club
Achievements of members of City of Edinburgh Racing Club

References

External links

1964 births
Living people
Scottish male cyclists
Scottish track cyclists
Cyclists at the 1986 Commonwealth Games
People from Huntly
Cyclists at the 1988 Summer Olympics
Olympic cyclists of Great Britain
Commonwealth Games medallists in cycling
Commonwealth Games bronze medallists for Scotland
Sportspeople from Aberdeenshire
Medallists at the 1986 Commonwealth Games